Zachary Leo Braudy (born April 8, 1993) is an American art dealer and art advisor based in Washington D.C.

Early life and education 
Braudy was born and raised in Alexandria, Virginia to a Jewish family. He is the grandson of art dealers Ethel and Arthur Furman, founders of Ethel A. Furman & Associates (now Capital Art Advisory). Braudy attended high school at St. Stephens & St. Agnes High School in Virginia and Rollins College in Florida.

Career 
In 2015 he took control of his family's business, Capital Art Advisory. In 2018, the company sold various paintings and sculptures by Bulgarian artist Stephen Sacklarian.

References 

Living people
American art dealers
1993 births
People from Virginia
American Jews
Jewish art collectors
Businesspeople from Virginia